This is a list of notable Black Nova Scotians.

Politicians 
Wayne Adams
Yvonne Atwell
Wanda Thomas Bernard, Canadian Senator
Mayann Francis, first black woman Lieutenant Governor of Nova Scotia
Daurene Lewis, first black woman mayor in Canada; recipient of Order of Canada
Donald Oliver, first black man to have a seat in the Senate; recipient of Order of Canada
Calvin Ruck, recipient of Order of Canada
Bill White

Artists 
Gary Beals, R&B musician
Keonte Beals, R&B musician
Walter Borden, actor
George Boyd, playwright/journalist
George Elliott Clarke, poet and playwright
Sterling Jarvis, singer and actor
Carshae Beals, R&B musician and actor 
Cy McLean, pianist and band leader
Kaleb Simmonds, R&B musician
Faith Nolan, folk and jazz musician
Rob "Blye" Paris of Citizen Kane, rapper
Nelson Symonds, jazz guitarist 
Portia White, operatic contralto
Jamie Sparks, R&B singer, composer, and brother of Jeremiah Sparks

Filmmakers 
Cory Bowles, Actor, Director

Athletes 
Marjorie Bailey, sprinter
George Dixon, boxer
Dwayne "The Rock" Johnson, American actor and former professional wrestler, son of Rocky Johnson
Kirk Johnson, boxer
Rocky Johnson, wrestler, father of Dwayne "The Rock" Johnson
Sam Langford, boxer
Lindell Wigginton, basketball player
Bill Riley, hockey player

Wayne Smith, football player
Alton White, hockey player
Tyrone Williams, football player
Pokey Reddick, hockey player
Ricky Anderson, boxer
Leonard Sinclair Sparks, boxer
Art Dorrington, hockey player
Stan 'Chook' Maxwell, hockey player
Clyde Gray, boxer
David Downey, boxer
Ray Downey, boxer

Veterans 
William Hall, Victoria Cross recipient
Benjamin Jackson, sailor and Civil War soldier
Jeremiah Jones, World WarI soldier
Joseph B. Noil, sailor and Medal of Honor recipient
Isaac Phills, World WarI soldier and Order of Canada recipient
William A. White, chaplain of No. 2 Construction Battalion in the Canadian Army in World WarI
Three Black Nova Scotians served in the American Civil War in the 54th Regiment Massachusetts Volunteer Infantry: Hammel Gilyer, Samuel Hazzard, and Thomas Page.

Activists 
Carrie Best
Viola Desmond
Burnley "Rocky" Jones, political activist
Joan Jones, political activist, businesswoman
William Pearly Oliver
Calvin W. Ruck, author of The Black Battalion
El Jones, activist

Other notables
Rose Fortune, considered first black woman police officer in Canada
James Robinson Johnston, lawyer and community leader
Beverly Mascoll, businesswoman
Maurice Ruddick (1912–1988), citizen of the year for his role in the 1958 Springhill Mining Disaster
Corrine Sparks, first African Nova Scotian to be appointed to the judiciary and first African Canadian woman to serve on the bench.
Edith Hester McDonald-Brown, considered first documented Black female painter in Canadian art history.
John Paris Jr., the first Black person to coach a pro hockey team.

References 

Black Nova Scotians 
Black Nova Scotians